The South Carolina Gamecocks men's swimming and diving team represents the University of South Carolina and competes in the Southeastern Conference. The team has been coached by former Florida Gators women's team coach Jeff Poppell since 2021.

References